Gerard Granollers and Oriol Roca Batalla were the defending champions but only Roca Batalla decided to defend his title, partnering Pedro Martínez. Roca Batalla lost in the quarterfinals to Kevin Krawietz and Maximilian Marterer.

Krawietz and Marterer won the title after defeating Uladzimir Ignatik and Michael Linzer 7–6(8–6), 4–6, [10–6] in the final.

Seeds

Draw

References
 Main Draw

Morocco Tennis Tour - Kenitra - Doubles
Morocco Tennis Tour – Kenitra
2016 Morocco Tennis Tour